This is a list of Australian television news services and programs.

National news stations in Australia

Dedicated channels 
 ABC News (2010–present)
 Sky News Australia (1996–present) (Pay TV)

Australian Broadcasting Corporation (ABC) 
 News Breakfast
 Weekend Breakfast
 ABC News at Noon
 ABC News - Early Edition
 7.30
 Insiders
 Four Corners
 Behind the News
 Q&A
 Catalyst
 Landline
 Offsiders
 One Plus One
 The Business
 The Drum
 The World

Network 10 

 Wake Up (2013–14)
 Meet the Press (1992-2013)
 The Project
 The Sunday Project
 6.30 with George Negus (2011)
 Breakfast (2012)

Nine Network 
 Nine Early Morning News
 Nine Morning News
  Nine News Now
 Nine Afternoon News
  Nine News: First at Five
 Today
 Weekend Today
 A Current Affair
 60 Minutes
 Nightline (1992-2008)
 Sunday (1981-2008)
 Nine News: Sunday AM (2008-2009)
 This Afternoon (2009)

Seven Network 
 Seven Early News
 Sunrise
 Seven Morning News
 Seven Afternoon News
  Seven News at 5
  Seven News - Late Night Updates

Special Broadcasting Service (SBS) 
 World News Australia
 World News Australia Late
 Dateline
 Insight
 Living Black

Local news services

Australian Capital Territory 

 ABC News ACT
 Prime7 News

New South Wales 

 ABC News NSW
 Nine News Sydney
 Seven News Sydney
 10 News First (Sydney local edition)

Northern Territory 

 ABC News Northern Territory 
 Nine News Darwin

Queensland 

 ABC News Queensland 
 Nine News Queensland
 Nine Gold Coast News
 Seven News Brisbane
 Seven Local News (Cairns, Townsville, Mackay, Wide Bay, Sunshine Coast, Rockhampton)
 10 News First (Brisbane local edition)

South Australia 

 ABC News South Australia
 Nine News Adelaide
 Seve News Adelaide
 10 News First (Adelaide local edition)

Tasmania 

 ABC News Tasmania 
 Southern Cross News (Tasmania)

Victoria 

 ABC News Victoria 
 Seven News Melbourne
 Nine News Melbourne
 10 News First (Melbourne local edition)

Western Australia 
 ABC News Western Australia 
 Nine News Perth
 Seven News Perth
 10 News First (Perth local edition)
 GWN7 News

Regional 
 WIN News
 Southern Cross News
 NBN News

See also 
 List of Australian television series

References 

Television lists by country